Cabuya may refer to:
Fique, a natural fiber
Cabuya, Coclé, Panama
Cabuya, Herrera, Panama
Cabuya, Panamá Oeste, Panama
Cabuya, Costa Rica